The Women's time trial C1–3 road cycling event at the 2016 Summer Paralympics took place on 14 September at Flamengo Park, Pontal. Twelve riders from nine nations competed.

The C1 category is for cyclists with upper or lower limb disabilities and most severe neurological dysfunction. The C2 category is for cyclists with upper or lower limb impairments and moderate to severe neurological dysfunction. The C3 category is for cyclists with moderate upper or lower limb dysfunctions and includes those with cerebral palsy, limb impairments and amputations.

Results

References

External links
 Entry List
 Medalists

Women's road time trial C1-3
2016 in women's road cycling